The Norman Church of St Peter in Portishead, Somerset, England, was built in 1320, on the site of a previous church, and rebuilt in the 14th and 15th centuries in the Perpendicular Gothic style. In 1952 it was made a Grade I listed building.

The vestry was added in 1828. The church was altered in 1978–1979.  It also has a new garden developed at the Millennium.

The churchyard contains the war graves of three Royal Navy sailors and an airman of World War II.

It has strong links with Christian primary schools such as St Peter's C of E.

Current Clergy
As of September 2021
the team ministry consists of Reverend Rob Eastwood Dewing (Team Rector), Revd Mark Fuller (Team Pilgrim) and Revd Laura Downs (Training Curate)

See also

 List of Grade I listed buildings in North Somerset
 List of towers in Somerset
 List of ecclesiastical parishes in the Diocese of Bath and Wells

References

Buildings and structures completed in 1320
Portishead
Portishead
Portishead
Portishead, Somerset